Datu Montawal, officially the Municipality of Datu Montawal (Maguindanaon: Ingud nu Datu Montawal; Iranun: Inged a Datu Montawal), is a 5th class municipality in the province of Maguindanao del Sur, Philippines. According to the 2020 census, it has a population of 37,314 people.

The municipality, then known as Pagagawan, was created under Muslim Mindanao Autonomy Act No. 95 on July 18, 2000, carved out of the municipality of Pagalungan. It was renamed to Datu Montawal under Muslim Mindanao Autonomy Act No. 152 on June 9, 2003.

Republic Act No. 11550 was signed on May 27, 2021. The law stated the creation of Maguindanao del Norte and Maguindanao del Sur, recognized the name of the municipality as Datu Montawal, no longer as Pagagawan and ceded the municipality to Maguindanao del Sur. The law had won via plebiscite on September 18, 2022.

Geography

Barangays

Datu Montawal is politically subdivided into 11 barangays.
Balatungkayo (Batungkayo)

Bulod
Dungguan
Limbalud
Maridagao
Nabundas
Pagagawan
Talapas
Talitay
Tunggol

Climate

Demographics

Economy

References

External links
 Datu Montawal Profile at the DTI Cities and Municipalities Competitive Index
 MMA Act No. 95 : An Act Creating the Municipality of Pagagawan in the Province of Maguindanao
 MMA Act No. 152 : An Act Changing the Name of Pagagawan in the Province of Maguindanao to Municipality of Datu Montawal
 [ Philippine Standard Geographic Code]
 Philippine Census Information
 Local Governance Performance Management System

Municipalities of Maguindanao del Sur